The six-tubercled Amazon River turtle or six-tubercled river turtle (Podocnemis sextuberculata) is a species of turtle in the family Podocnemididae.

It is found in the Amazon basin in Brazil, Colombia, Peru and possibly Ecuador.

References 

Podocnemis
Turtles of South America
Fauna of the Amazon
Reptiles of Brazil
Reptiles of Colombia
Reptiles of Peru
Reptiles described in 1849
Taxa named by Emilio Cornalia
Taxonomy articles created by Polbot